The Automotive Historic District in Birmingham, Alabama, is a  historic district roughly bounded by First Avenue North, 24th Street South, Fifth Avenue South, and 20th Street South. It was listed on the National Register of Historic Places in 1991. At the time of listing, the district included 119 contributing buildings (and 17 non-contributing ones) and four contributing structures (and 16 non-contributing ones).

The district covers a second area of commercial development south of the downtown area of Birmingham.

See also
Birmingham District

References

External links

Historic American Engineering Record in Alabama
Italianate architecture in Alabama
Late 19th and Early 20th Century American Movements architecture
National Register of Historic Places in Jefferson County, Alabama